Music from Sindh, is sung and is generally performed in either the "Baits" or "Waee" styles.  The Baits style is vocal music in Sanhoon (low voice) or Graham (high voice).  Waee instrumental music is performed in a variety of ways using a string instrument. Waee, also known as Kafi, is popular in the surrounding areas of Balochistan, Punjab, and Kutch.

Sindhi Sufi music

Shah Jo Raag 

The traditional compilations of Shah Jo Risalo by Shah Abdul Latif Bhitai include 30 Suras (chapters) which are sang as raags. The oldest publications of Shah Jo Risalo contained 36 Suras, but later six of the Suras were rejected because the language and content did not correspond to the style of the Shah. Recently, Nabi Bakhsh Baloch, the most famous Sindhi linguist has compiled and published a new publication after 32 years of research, into popular culture and the history of the Sindhi language. The famous singer Abida Parveen has recorded the entire Shah's Suras on her 11th volume CD Shah Jo Risalo, released in December 2013.

The 30 traditional Suras included in Shah Jo Risalo are:

Bilawal
Kalyan 
Yaman Kalyan 
Khambhat 
Suri Raag 
Samundi 
Sohni 
Sasui Aburi 
Maazuri 
Desi 
Kohyari 
Husaini 
Laila Chanesar 
Mumal Ranu 
Marvi 
Kaamod 
Ghatu 
Sorath 
Kedaro 
Sarang 
Asaa 
Ripp 
Khahori 
Barwo Sindhi 
Ramkali 
Kapa'iti
Purab 
Karayal 
Pirbhati 
Dahar
 misri solangi

Instruments used in Sindhi music 

Common instruments used in Sindhi regional music include:

 Ektara known as Ektaro in Sindhi
 Tanpura known as Tanpuro in Sindhi
 Alghoza Flute
 Bansuri
 Pungi known as Been in Sindhi
 Narr
 Naghara
 Dhol
 Borrindo
 Rabbab

Notable Sindhi musicians 

Abida Parveen
Allan Faqir
Sarmad Sindhi
Humera Channa
Mai Bhaghi
Manzoor Sakhirani
Noor Bano
Rubina Qureshi
Saif Samejo
Sanam Marvi
Sohrab Fakir
Ustad Manzoor Ali Khan
Ustad Mohammad Ibrahim
Ustad Muhammad Juman
Ustad Muhammad Yousuf
Ustad Misri Faqeer Makhmoor
Zarina Baloch
Zeb-un-Nissa

Sindhi songs
Some famous Sindhi songs include "Ho Jamalo", "Sindh Muhinji Amma", "Parchan Shaal Pavar Dhola" and "Peren Pavandi Saan."
Waheed Ali, Barkat Ali, Misri Faqeer and Khatadar Ahiyan are well-known Sindhi musicians.

See also
 Sindhi songs
 List of Sindhi singers
 Sindhi music videos

References

External links 
First International Sindhi Radio with variety of 6 stations & 24/7 broadcast 
Collection of Sindhi Music Online
Classic Sindhi Audio Stories for Children
Free Sindhi Music Ringtones, Sindhi MP3 Tones

 
Pakistani styles of music